The Uinta Basin Rail project is a proposed  rail line to connect the shale oil rich Uinta Basin region of eastern Utah to the national rail network. Numerous proposals have been made, some as far back as 1902, that are still under consideration. The current effort is a public-private partnership between a coalition of 7 counties in Utah, the Rio Grande Pacific Corporation and Drexel Hamilton Infrastructure Partners. The railroad is also backed by the Ute Tribe who hold a 5% stake in the project. If the rail line is built it will be the first major greenfield rail line built in the United States since the line to the Powder River Basin was built in the 1970s. The Surface Transportation Board approved  construction of the line in December 2021.

Past efforts
The Uinta basin's oil and mineral resources have long attracted the attention of railroad builders. The Denver and Salt Lake Railway (D&SL) was a company started in 1902 with a goal of connecting its namesake cities via the Uinta basin, to take advantage of these resources. While a significant portion of the line in Colorado was built, and still exists today, the company struggled financially and never progressed any closer than Craig, Colorado to the Uinta basin. After this effort failed, almost immediately other efforts began.

The only rail line connecting the basin to the rail network that was actually built was the Uintah Railway. However, while the line served the basin for a few years, this line was problematic from day one. The Uintah Railway had a break of gauge, as this branch line was narrow gauge but connected to a standard gauge main at Mack, Colorado. The line featured a 7.5% grade with 65-degree curves, and was so steep that only articulated Shay locomotives, specifically designed for this route, were capable of navigating a portion of the line. This resulted in a single cargo train having to be both re-gauged, and multiple locomotive changeovers to reach its destination. All but the last few miles of the line were in Colorado, and the line was more useful to ship goods to Colorado rather than other cities in Utah. The book Utah Ghost Rails documents that through a bureaucratic loophole, the USPS charged in-state rates for shipping between the basin and Salt Lake City, assuming a straight line distance to calculate the rate, despite them using the Uintah Railway, and having to route the mail to Colorado first and then back into Utah. This meant it was significantly cheaper to ship by mail than pay the railroad directly. A number of businesses soon discovered this loophole, and when the builders of a bank in the town of Vernal learned this, they shipped 30 tons of bricks, one at a time, by mail. This nearly bankrupted the Utah division of the postal service, forcing them to adjust the shipping zone boundaries and regulations to match the geographical isolation of the Uinta Basin from the rest of Utah. Once modern highways were built into the basin, the line was unable to compete with truck traffic and was abandoned in 1939.

Even while the Uintah Railway was in operation, many companies attempted to build a standard gauge connection to the Uinta Basin. In 1915, the Union Pacific Railroad was reported to have dispatched surveying parties to find a route through the area. In early 1916, the Denver and Rio Grande Railroad filed a proposal for a line that would eventually extend into the basin, and in May the Los Angeles and Salt Lake Railroad began surveys for a route into the area branching from its line in Provo. In 1920, Simon Bamberger attempted to find financing to build the remainder of the unfinished D&SL route. None of these plans came to fruition.

In 1984, the Deseret Power Railway was built to connect a coal mine in Colorado with a power plant in Utah. The route is similar to a small portion of the unfinished D&SL route; however it is completely isolated from the national rail network.

Utah Department of Transportation study

In 2012, the Utah Department of Transportation (UDOT), working with the regional Six-County Infrastructure Coalition, began studying transportation in the basin, which is a major oil-producing region. The study determined that the existing infrastructure was unlikely to be able to move the expected volume of oil. In 2013, HDR Engineering, working with the state, began surveying the area for a rail line. After examining 26 potential routings, the state recommended a route east through the Indian Canyon from the Union Pacific Railroad's Central Corridor line near Soldier Summit to Duchesne and Roosevelt in the basin. The right of way would largely follow existing roadways, US Route 191 from the rail main through Indian Canyon to the basin and US Route 40 once inside the basin.  There would be two terminals for oil trains at the mid and endpoints of the railroad. The key feature of this route would be a  tunnel underneath the Roan Cliffs of the West Tavaputs Plateau, to bypass the  mountain pass used by US 191 in this area, that if built would be the longest railroad tunnel in Utah.

In late 2014, after selecting the routing, the state began studying the cost, estimated to be up to $4 billion. With a total of $8.2 million in funding from the state, the Department of Transportation also began work on the Environmental Impact Statement (EIS) for the railroad, with planned to complete the document by the end of 2016. Several months after beginning work on the EIS, however, the state decided to end study of the route, citing rising costs identified by closer study. Kevin Van Tassell, a member of the state legislature's transportation committee, said the state would "look at other systems to move product out of the basin other than the railroad at this time."

Though the EIS was cancelled, UDOT's report was published in 2015 recommending the line as a top priority for Utah's rail infrastructure, noting the strain the lack of rail access is placing on highways that serve the basin, and the price disadvantage caused by lack of rail access compared to other oil-producing regions with rail. Most of the oil is trucked to refineries in Salt Lake City. The study identified multiple possible rail corridors, stating before selecting the Indian Canyon alternative, they originally considered a route via Rifle, Colorado, but noted this route is mostly in Colorado, not Utah. The state of Colorado was not assisting in the studies or providing funding.

Public private partnership

In 2019, the Seven County Infrastructure Coalition (successor agency to the Six County Infrastructure Coalition) partnered with Rio Grande Pacific Corporation, a shortline railroad holding company, and identified 29 potential rail corridors, using the earlier UDOT study as a base. In addition to the routes identified by UDOT, this study considered historical routes surveyed a century prior. Their study opined that the line was feasible, and that UDOT had included elements in the design that could be modified or eliminated to cut costs.

The coalition initially submitted four routes to the Surface Transportation Board (STB) for detailed study and an Environmental Impact Statement. Three of these would connect to the Central Corridor near Soldier Summit and proceed north east towards the basin. The fourth option would extend the former D&SL line from its terminus in Craig. It would use the existing Deseret Power Railway for a portion of the journey, and in so doing connect that line to the national rail network as well. The study noted that the Craig alternative traversed the easiest terrain, was the only option to not require constructing tunnels, and overall was one of the lower-cost options. The Craig option required the most new track to be built. The STB announced they had removed this option from consideration while reviewing and preparing the Environmental Impact statement on December 13, 2019. Both agencies cited a concern that while the Central Corridor is subject to a trackage rights agreement that allows a number of rail companies access to the line, there is no such agreement in place for the branch to Craig. The Craig alternative required negotiating access agreements with 3 separate track owners, and after months of negotiation, no agreement with any owner had been reached. Two of the track owners used the line exclusively for transporting coal, whose business has dramatically decreased. Even if access rights could be secured, the STB and the coalition decided there was a risk the Unita Basin Rail operators could be forced to assume ownership and/or maintenance costs for these sections, should coal volumes continue to decrease. 

Of the 3 routes remaining under study, the Surface Transportation Board recommended one called the Whitmore Park alternative as having the least environmental impact, and approved its construction. This alternative is based on the Indian Canyon alternative surveyed by UDOT. Other modifications included using a longer route and side canyons to scale the Roan Cliffs, avoiding a landslide area identified as a risk by UDOT, and adjusted routing in parts of the basin for easier land access rights. In September 2020, it was announced that Drexel Hamilton Infrastructure Partners, LP (DHIP) would fund construction for the line and have the exclusive right to develop the line, thus giving the rail project the green light to start construction. In December 2020, environmentalist groups filed a lawsuit attempting to block construction, claiming the project is primarily to benefit fossil fuel extraction. Some of the funding allocated to the project was instead intended to help diversify the economy of rural Utah away from fossil fuels.

The Surface Transportation Board issued their approval in December 2021. Environmentalist activists are organizing efforts to block construction, citing the pristine nature of the mountains where construction will take place and concerns cost overruns are likely given the difficult terrain. In 2022 construction contracts for the railroad's construction particularly for the tunnels along the route were announced with AECOM, a joint venture with Skanska & W.W. Clyde Company, and Obayashi Corporation as principal partners. The US Forest Service granted right-of-way through  of Ashley National Forest and upheld the decision when challenged by several environmental groups. A $28 million grant by the Utah Community Impact Fund Board was also upheld in July 2022 after being challenged.

References

Proposed railway lines in the United States
Transportation in Duchesne County, Utah
2023 in rail transport